Decebal Virgil Nicolae Gheară (born 12 September 1978), commonly known as Decebal Gheară, is a Romanian former professional footballer who played as a centre back. Gheară started his career at Corvinul Hunedoara football academy. At senior level he made his debut for Corvinul Hunedoara, but his Liga I debut was only on 20 September 2002 for Oțelul Galați, in 1–0 victory against Petrolul Ploiești. He also played in Romania for teams such as: Farul Constanţa, Delta Tulcea or Săgeata Năvodari and in Greece for Panachaiki.

External links
 
 

1978 births
Living people
Sportspeople from Hunedoara
Romanian footballers
Association football defenders
Liga I players
Liga II players
CS Corvinul Hunedoara players
ASC Oțelul Galați players
FCV Farul Constanța players
FC Delta Dobrogea Tulcea players
AFC Săgeata Năvodari players
Football League (Greece) players
Panachaiki F.C. players
Romanian expatriate footballers
Romanian expatriate sportspeople in Greece
Expatriate footballers in Greece